Exechesops is a genus of beetles belonging to the family Anthribidae.

The species of this genus are found in Eastern Europe, Southern Africa, Southeastern Asia.

Species
Species:

Exechesops acaulus 
Exechesops alces 
Exechesops antiallus 
Exechesops auritus 
Exechesops bakeri 
Exechesops becvari 
Exechesops bos 
Exechesops capensis 
Exechesops clivinus 
Exechesops convexipennis 
Exechesops coomani 
Exechesops cristatus 
Exechesops diopsideus 
Exechesops discoidalis 
Exechesops elenae 
Exechesops eminens 
Exechesops epipastus 
Exechesops fernandus 
Exechesops ferrealis 
Exechesops foliatus 
Exechesops fornicatus 
Exechesops glabriceps 
Exechesops griseus 
Exechesops helmiscus 
Exechesops holzschuhi 
Exechesops horni 
Exechesops infortunatus 
Exechesops isabella 
Exechesops jordani 
Exechesops kalshoveni 
Exechesops latifrons 
Exechesops latipes 
Exechesops latus 
Exechesops leptipus 
Exechesops leucopis 
Exechesops lituratus 
Exechesops lividipes 
Exechesops molitor 
Exechesops monstrosus 
Exechesops mopanae 
Exechesops phodinus 
Exechesops quadrituberculatus 
Exechesops quadrituberculatus 
Exechesops rectimargo 
Exechesops repletus 
Exechesops semnus 
Exechesops signatellus 
Exechesops simus 
Exechesops sobrinus 
Exechesops tenuipes 
Exechesops tibialis 
Exechesops triangularis 
Exechesops validus 
Exechesops vigens 
Exechesops wollastoni

References

Anthribidae